Khokhlachi is a rural locality (a village) in Golovinskoye Rural Settlement, Sudogodsky District, Vladimir Oblast, Russia. The population was 42 as of 2010.

Geography 
Khokhlachi is located on the Soyma River, 13 km northwest of Sudogda (the district's administrative centre) by road. Ovtsyno is the nearest rural locality.

References 

Rural localities in Sudogodsky District